Marie-Angèle Picado (13 December 1934 – 27 October 1997) was a French sprinter. She competed in the women's 4 × 100 metres relay at the 1956 Summer Olympics.

References

External links
 

1934 births
1997 deaths
Athletes (track and field) at the 1956 Summer Olympics
French female sprinters
French female hurdlers
Olympic athletes of France
Athletes from Lisbon
20th-century French women